Dylan Thomas Sprouse (born August 4, 1992) is an American actor. He is best known for his role as Zack Martin on the Disney Channel series The Suite Life of Zack & Cody and its spin-off, The Suite Life on Deck, where he starred alongside his twin brother Cole Sprouse. He is an owner of the All-Wise Meadery in Brooklyn, New York.

Early life
Sprouse was born August 4, 1992, in Arezzo, Italy, to American parents, Matthew Sprouse and Melanie Wright. Dylan was born 15 minutes before his twin brother Cole Sprouse and was named after Welsh poet and writer Dylan Thomas. When the twins were four months old, they moved to Long Beach, California, their parents' hometown.

Career
Sprouse started his career in 1993 on television, alongside his twin brother Cole Sprouse, sharing the role of Patrick Kelly in Grace Under Fire until 1998. For the next several years, he continued to appear in several films and television series with his brother. Sprouse co-starred alongside his brother in the Disney Channel series The Suite Life of Zack & Cody from 2005 to 2008.

In 2017, he was cast in the lead role of Lucas Ward for the thriller film Dismissed. In the same year, he appeared in a short film, Carte Blanche, and was cast in comedy film Banana Split as Nick. In 2018, Sprouse opened All-Wise Meadery in Williamsburg, Brooklyn, the name of which is a reference to his Heathen religion.

He joined the short film Daddy as Paul in 2019.

In 2020, Sprouse starred as Trevor in After We Collided, the sequel to the 2019 film After. In May 2020, it was announced that Heavy Metal and DiGa Studios would be releasing the first issue of Sprouse's comic book Sun Eater.

In 2021, he starred in Tyger Tyger as Luke Hart and in the Chinese film The Curse of Turandot as Calaf.

Personal life
Following the end of The Suite Life on Deck in 2011, Sprouse attended New York University's Gallatin School of Individualized Study and obtained a four-year degree in video game design. He has identified as a Heathen since age 15.

Since 2018, Sprouse has been in a relationship with model Barbara Palvin. They resided in Brooklyn for over two years, before moving to Los Angeles in 2021.

Filmography

With the exception of Piggy Banks and Snow Buddies, all appearances prior to 2017 were either roles shared with Cole Sprouse—that is, in which the two portrayed one single character—or projects on which they both worked but portrayed separate characters.

Film

Television

Music videos

Video games

Other

Awards and nominations

Discography
"A Dream Is a Wish Your Heart Makes" (Disneymania 4) (2005)
"A Dream Is a Wish Your Heart Makes" (Princess Disneymania) (2008)

References

External links

1992 births
20th-century American male actors
21st-century American male actors
Adherents of Germanic neopaganism
American male child actors
American male film actors
American male television actors
American modern pagans
Identical twin male actors
Living people
Male actors from Long Beach, California
New York University Gallatin School of Individualized Study alumni
People from Arezzo
People from Calabasas, California
American identical twin child actors